Carl Friedrich Freiherr von Langen (25 July 1887 in Klein Belitz – 2 August 1934 in Potsdam) was a German horse rider who competed in the 1928 Summer Olympics.

In 1928 he and his horse Draufgänger won the gold medal in the individual dressage event as well as in the team dressage competition. He also participated with his horse Falkner in the individual jumping competition and finished 28th. As member of the German jumping team they finished seventh in the team jumping event.

Notes

References
 Carl-Friedrich Freiherr von Langen: Reiten über Hindernisse, Olms Verlag, (Nachdr. d. Ausg. Kiel, Hannover 1931 u. 1933), reprint 1983, (German, autobiography)
 Nele Maya Fahnenbruck: "...reitet für Deutschland": Pferdesport und Politik im Nationalsozialismus. Die Werkstatt, 15. März 2013,  (German, dissertation University of Hamburg)
 Langen, Carl-Friedrich Freiherr von – entry at Neue Deutsche Biographie
 Joachim Puttkamer: Mecklenburg-Vorpommern: 100 berühmte Köpfe. Sutton Verlag 2011, S. 102

External links
 
 
 

1887 births
1934 deaths
People from Rostock (district)
People from the Grand Duchy of Mecklenburg-Schwerin
Barons of Germany
German dressage riders
German show jumping riders
Olympic equestrians of Germany
Equestrians at the 1928 Summer Olympics
German male equestrians
German Army personnel of World War I
Olympic gold medalists for Germany
Olympic medalists in equestrian
Medalists at the 1928 Summer Olympics
Sturmabteilung officers